was a village located in Naka District, Tokushima Prefecture, Japan.

As of 2003, the village had an estimated population of 901 and a density of 5.81 persons per km². The total area was 154.97 km².

On March 1, 2005, Kisawa, along with the towns of Aioi, Kaminaka and Wajiki, and the village of Kito (all from Naka District), was merged to create the city of Naka.

External links 
Naka official website 

Dissolved municipalities of Tokushima Prefecture
Naka, Tokushima